Delias caeneus is a butterfly in the family Pieridae. It was described by Carl Linnaeus in 1758. It is found in the Australasian realm.

The wingspan is about 70–76 mm.

Subspecies
D. c. ceneus (Ambon, Serang, Moluccas)
D. c. philotis (Wallace, 1867) (Buru)

References

External links
Delias at Markku Savela's Lepidoptera and Some Other Life Forms

caeneus
Butterflies described in 1758
Taxa named by Carl Linnaeus